Joseph Cranston (July 29, 1924 – October 2, 2014) was an American actor, director, screenwriter, producer, author, boxer, and father of actor Bryan Cranston.

Early life
Joseph Louis Cranston was born in  Chicago, Illinois to Alice Rose (née Bower) and Edward Bernard Cranston Sr.  He has an older brother, Edward Jr. (1923-2009) and a younger sister Marguerite (1928-1991). They have an older half sister named Kathleen (1913-1930) from their father's first marriage.

Career 
Cranston began his career as a television actor on several programs including Space Patrol and Dragnet. Cranston's first appearance as an actor on film was an uncredited role in the film Beginning of the End in 1957.

On March 9, 1971, Cranston formed Joseph Cranston Productions, Inc. which was responsible for presenting the 7th Annual Academy of Country and Western Music Awards in 1972.

Filmography

Television  
 Dragnet (1953)
 Space Patrol (1953)
 The Red Skelton Hour (1954)
 Life with Elizabeth (1954)
 Shower of Stars (1955)
 Annie Oakley (1956)
 Father Knows Best (1956)
 Highway Patrol (1956)
 The Gale Storm Show: Oh! Susanna (1957)
 Bronco (1960)
 General Electric Theater (1960)
 My Three Sons (1961)

Film 
 Beginning of the End (1957, Actor)
 Go, Johnny, Go! (1959, Actor)
 Erotica (1961, Narrator)
 Trauma (1962, Producer)
 The Crawling Hand (1963, Producer)
 The Corpse Grinders (1971, Writer)
 The Big Turnaround (1988, Director)

Personal life 
Cranston married his first wife, Angela Jeraldine Gordon-Forbes in 1946 and they divorced in 1951. Cranston married his second wife, actress Peggy Sell in 1952. They had three children, including actor Bryan Cranston, who was born March 1956.

In 1968, after having trouble keeping steady work, Cranston temporarily left show business, a decision that caused a severe break in his family's home life. This led to him separating from his second wife, Peggy Sell and leaving his two sons, Bryan and Kyle and his daughter, Amy, who were forced to live with their grandparents for some time. Cranston would not reconnect with his sons and daughter until 10 years later.

Cranston married his third wife, Anita Cynthia Stickney in 1971 until her death in 1997.

Cranston has Irish heritage and was named after his great-grandfather, Joseph Cranston.

References

External links
 

1924 births
2014 deaths